Rafael Nadal defeated Daniil Medvedev in the final, 2–6, 6–7(5–7), 6–4, 6–4, 7–5 to win the men's singles tennis title at the 2022 Australian Open. It was his second Australian Open title and 21st major singles title overall, surpassing the all-time record he had jointly held with Roger Federer and Novak Djokovic. Nadal became the fourth man, after Roy Emerson, Rod Laver, and Djokovic, to achieve the double career Grand Slam, and the second in the Open Era. He also became the first man in the Open Era to win an Australian Open final after losing the first two sets. This marked the third consecutive year a man trailed by two sets in a major final yet rallied to win, following Djokovic's two-set comeback at the 2021 French Open and Dominic Thiem's at the 2020 US Open.

Djokovic was the three-time reigning champion, but did not compete after his visa was cancelled shortly before the tournament began due to an intervention from Australia's Immigration Minister Alex Hawke, citing risks to public health and good order in Australia. That meant Nadal was the only former champion (2009) to compete in the tournament, with both Federer and Stan Wawrinka sidelined by injury. Djokovic retained the ATP No. 1 singles ranking despite being unable to defend his points after Medvedev and Alexander Zverev lost in the final and fourth round, respectively.

Matteo Berrettini became the first man born in the 1990s to reach the quarterfinals at all four majors, and the first Italian man to reach the semifinals of the Australian Open.

Seeds

Draw

Finals

Top half

Section 1

Section 2

Section 3

Section 4

Bottom half

Section 5

Section 6

Section 7

Section 8

Seeded players
The following are the seeded players. Seedings are based on ATP rankings as of 10 January 2022. Rank and points before are as of 17 January 2022.

As a result of pandemic-related adjustments to the ranking system and changes to the ATP Tour calendar in 2020 and 2021, ranking points after the tournament (as of 31 January 2022) were calculated as follows:
 Players who were defending points from the 2020 tournament (i.e. players whose 2020 results exceeded or were equal to their 2021 results) had their 2020 points replaced by points from the 2022 tournament; as of 31 January 2022, these players could also count their 2021 points towards their ranking if the 2021 points exceeded their 19th best result (in other words, points from the 2021 and 2022 tournaments could be counted simultaneously instead of under the previous "better of" system)
 Players who were defending points from the 2021 tournament (i.e. players whose 2021 points exceeded their 2020 points) had their 19th best result replaced by their points from the 2022 tournament; these players continued to count their 2021 points alongside their 2022 points at the end of the tournament because the 2021 tournament was delayed by three weeks compared to the normal schedule and the "better of" logic for calculating ATP ranking points had been discontinued
 All players who have points from the 2021 tournament still counting towards their ranking on 31 January 2022 will have those points dropped on 21 February 2022 (52 weeks after the 2021 tournament) and replaced by their next best result

Note that this is a different ranking adjustment system than the one being used by the WTA for the women's event.

† The player's 2020 points were replaced by his 2022 points, and his 19th best result was replaced by his 2021 points. The 2021 points will be dropped three weeks after the end of the 2022 tournament.
§ The player was defending points from a 2020 ITF tournament.

Withdrawn players
The following players would have been seeded, but withdrew before the tournament began.

Djokovic visa controversy

Djokovic lost his ability to compete when his visa to enter Australia was cancelled. Despite being granted a medical exemption to the tournament's COVID-19 vaccine requirement by Tennis Australia, the Australian Border Force confirmed that after being detained at Melbourne Airport for eight hours, Djokovic's visa had been cancelled and he would be denied entry to the country due to not meeting exemption criteria to Australia's vaccination requirements. Djokovic sought an injunction to prevent his deportation. The Federal Circuit and Family Court ruled in favour of Djokovic, ordered his release from detention and directed the federal government to pay his legal expenses. On 14 January Minister for Immigration Alex Hawke used his discretionary power under sections 133C(3) and 116(1)(e)(i) of the Migration Act 1958 to cancel Djokovic's visa on health and good order grounds. Djokovic sought a judicial review against deportation, but three Federal Court of Australia judges unanimously rejected the review on 16 January, preventing him from defending his title.

Other entry information

Wildcards 

Source:

Qualifiers

Lucky losers

Withdrawals 

Sources:

See also 
 2022 ATP Tour
 2022 French Open – Men's singles
 2022 Wimbledon Championships – Men's singles
 2022 US Open – Men's singles
 List of Grand Slam men's singles champions

Notes

References

External links
 Association of Tennis Professionals (ATP) – 2022 Australian Open Men's Singles draw
 2022 Australian Open – Men's draws and results at the International Tennis Federation

Men's Singles
Australian Open - Men's Singles
2022